Sebastian Kowalczyk (born 22 August 1998) is a Polish professional footballer who plays as a midfielder for Pogoń Szczecin.

International career
He received his first call up to the senior Poland squad in March 2021 and was on the bench for the match against England.

Career statistics

References

External links

1998 births
Living people
Polish footballers
Association football midfielders
Pogoń Szczecin players
Ekstraklasa players
III liga players
Poland youth international footballers
Poland under-21 international footballers
Sportspeople from Szczecin